Wymer is a surname. Notable people with the surname include:

Beth Wymer (born 1972), American gymnast
John Wymer (1928–2006), British archeologist
John Wymer (1933–2005), Australian rules footballer

See also
Wyner